Mohammadgarh or Muhammadgarh is a town in Gyaraspur tehsil, Vidisha district, Bhopal division of Madhya Pradesh, India. It is located at an altitude of 432 m above sea level. The language of the local population is Hindi.

History
Formerly this town was the capital of Mohammadgarh State, a princely state in Central India, under the Bhopal Agency. It had a population of 856 according to the 1901 Census of India. The town of Muhammadgarh was founded by Muhammad Khan and named after his name.

References

External links
Madhya Pradesh, State of, India - LatLongWiki.com

Cities and towns in Vidisha district
Former capital cities in India